The 1906 Canadian census was the first of a series of special conducted by the Government of Canada conducted covering the rapidly expanding Northwest Provinces of Alberta, Saskatchewan, and Manitoba. These censuses were conducted every ten years from 1906 to 1946.

The paper records of responses were microfilmed and the original paper forms were destroyed. The microfilm has since been scanned and converted into a series of images which are now available online at the Library and Archives Canada web site.

The previous census was the nationwide 1901 census and the following census was the nationwide 1911 census.

External links 
Census of the Northwest Provinces, 1906

Census
Censuses in Canada
Canada